"Hanging judge" is a colloquial phrase for a judge who has gained notoriety for handing down punishment by sentencing convicted persons to death by hanging, or otherwise imposing unusually harsh sentences. Hanging judges are officers of the court with mandates, as opposed to extralegal lynch law.

History

17th century
 George Jeffreys, 1st Baron Jeffreys
Salathiel Lovell

19th century
 Matthew Baillie Begbie, Vancouver and Victoria judge
 Isaac Charles Parker, U.S. district judge

20th century
 Nikolai Krylenko, Bolshevik revolutionary, prosecutor, and Minister of Justice of the USSR
 Roland Freisler, president (presiding judge) of the Nazi Volksgerichtshof (d. 3 February 1945)
 Vasiliy Ulrikh, Soviet jurist, chief presiding judge at the Moscow Show Trials during the Great Purge
 Sadegh Khalkhali, Shia cleric of the Islamic Republic of Iran
 Choor Singh, Singaporean judge of the Supreme Court of Singapore

Cultural references 
 A character in the Bob Dylan song "Lily, Rosemary and the Jack of Hearts" (album: Blood on the Tracks)
 Justice Wargrave in Agatha Christie's novel And Then There Were None
 The Hanging Judge, a 1918 film directed by Henry Edwards
 A track on the 1991 Armored Saint album Symbol of Salvation
 Justice Sir Francis Brittain in Bruce Hamilton's 1949 novel Hanging Judge; the novel was adapted for the stage by Raymond Massey in 1952, and Boris Karloff played Justice Brittain in the BBC Radio adaptation of the play in 1953.
 The title of jazz and cultural critic Stanley Crouch's 1990 essay collection Notes of a Hanging Judge

References

Capital punishment
Informal legal terminology